Laura Cox (born 24 November 1990) is an Anglo-French guitarist, singer and songwriter. Since 2008, she has achieved international recognition on YouTube as a guitarist. She is also the singer and lead guitarist of the Laura Cox Band, a rock band that she formed in 2013.

Early life
Laura Cox was born in France on 24 November 1990. Her mother is French and her father is English. She first picked up the guitar at the age of 14, in 2005, as a left-hander who plays right-handed, using a cheap classical guitar that her aunt gave her. Her first electric guitar was a Squier Showmaster. She first started posting her cover versions and guitar solos on YouTube in 2008. Following her success with YouTube, she became the singer and lead guitarist of the Laura Cox Band; a rock band that she formed in 2013 in the Paris region.

Equipment
Laura Cox uses Gibson Les Paul and Bacchus guitars, Orange amplifiers and Ernie Ball strings, and has also used Gibson Firebird, Fender Telecaster, Fender Stratocaster and Epiphone Les Paul guitars.

Discography

Laura Cox Band
 Hard Blues Shot (2017), recorded and mixed by Joseph Noia at Midi Live Studio (France)

Laura Cox
 Burning Bright (2019)
 Head Above Water (2023)

References

Further reading

External links
Official YouTube channel
Laura Cox Band official site

1990 births
21st-century French women musicians
21st-century French women singers
Blues rock musicians
French women guitarists
French women singer-songwriters
French people of English descent
French rock guitarists
French rock singers
Lead guitarists
Living people
Music YouTubers
YouTube channels launched in 2008
20th-century French women